Robert Tuliatu (born 11 October 1995) is a Greece international rugby league footballer who plays as a  for the Newcastle Thunder in the Betfred Championship.

He previously played for the West Wales Raiders and the London Skolars in Betfred League 1. He also played for the London Broncos in the Championship and spent time on loan from the Broncos at the Skolars in League 1.

Background 
Tuliatu was born in Sydney, New South Wales, Australia, to a Samoan father and Greek mother.

He is a qualified solicitor.

Playing career

Club career 
He played junior rugby league for the Cessnock Goannas. He came through the youth system at the Newcastle Knights.

He later played for the Newcastle Rebels and the Australian Universities side.

Tuliatu played in the Ron Massey Cup for the Mount Pritchard Mounties and the Asquith Magpies.

In 2019 he played for the West Wales Raiders in Betfred League 1.

Later in 2019 he joined the London Skolars in the same competition in a mid-season transfer.

He played for the Cessnock Goannas and won the premiership with them in 2020.

He joined the London Broncos at the start of the 2022 season. He spent time on loan from the Broncos at the Skolars in League 1.

International career 
In 2018 Tuliatu made his international début for  against .

He was also selected for the 2018 Emerging Nations World Championship and Greece's World Cup Qualification squad.

In 2022 Tuliatu was named in the Greece squad for the 2021 Rugby League World Cup, the first ever Greek Rugby League squad to compete in a World Cup.

References

External links 
London Broncos profile
West Wales Raiders profile
Greece profile
Greek profile

1995 births
Living people
Asquith Magpies players
Australian rugby league players
Australian people of Greek descent
Australian sportspeople of Samoan descent
Australian expatriate sportspeople in England
Australian expatriate rugby league players
Australian expatriate sportspeople in Wales
Cessnock Goannas players
Expatriate rugby league players in England
Expatriate rugby league players in Wales
Greece national rugby league team players
Greek expatriate sportspeople in England
Greek expatriate sportspeople in Wales
London Broncos players
London Skolars players
Mount Pritchard Mounties players
Newcastle Thunder players
Rugby league players from Sydney
Rugby league props
South Wales Scorpions players